Jennifer "Jenny" Wallwork (born 17 January 1987 in Bolton) is an English badminton player who has achieved international success in both the women's events and the mixed doubles event, including a Commonwealth Silver medal in 2010. She represented her country 42 times, being the highest ranking female player for 4 years.

She won the mixed doubles Bulgarian International in 2004, the Scottish Open in 2005, and the Dutch Open in 2006. She won the Swedish International mixed doubles in 2012. She won the women's doubles at the Irish International in 2005. Her mother, Jill played badminton for England, and her father, Brian is a coach for the sport.

In 2011 Jenny won both the mixed and women's doubles at the English National Championships but 2013 she quit professional badminton after saying she was undervalued and ignored by the governing body Badminton England.

Record against selected opponents
Mixed Doubles results with Nathan Robertson against Super Series finalists, World Championships semifinalists, and Olympic quarterfinalists.

  Xu Chen & Ma Jin 0–3
  Zhang Nan & Zhao Yunlei 0–2
  Zheng Bo & Ma Jin 0–1
  Chen Hung-ling & Cheng Wen-hsing 1–3
  Lee Sheng-mu & Chien Yu-chin 1–0
  Joachim Fischer Nielsen & Christinna Pedersen 0–2
  Thomas Laybourn & Kamilla Rytter Juhl 1–4
 / Chris Adcock & Imogen Bankier 1–0
  Anthony Clark & Donna Kellogg 0–1
  Tontowi Ahmad & Liliyana Natsir 1–2
  Fran Kurniawan & Pia Zebadiah Bernadet 1–0
  Nova Widianto & Liliyana Natsir 0–1
  Koo Kien Keat & Wong Pei Tty 0–2
  Robert Mateusiak & Nadieżda Zięba 1–2
  Songphon Anugritayawon & Kunchala Voravichitchaikul 1–1
  Sudket Prapakamol & Saralee Thungthongkam 1–1

References

External links 
 

English female badminton players
Sportspeople from Bolton
1987 births
Living people
People from Garforth
People educated at Garforth Academy
Badminton players at the 2010 Commonwealth Games
Commonwealth Games medallists in badminton
Commonwealth Games bronze medallists for England
Medallists at the 2010 Commonwealth Games